Lionel Mordecai Trilling (July 4, 1905 – November 5, 1975) was an American literary critic, short story writer, essayist, and teacher. He was one of the leading U.S. critics of the 20th century who analyzed the contemporary cultural, social, and political implications of literature. With his wife Diana Trilling (née Rubin), whom he married in 1929, he was a member of the New York Intellectuals and contributor to the Partisan Review.

Personal and academic life
Lionel Mordecai Trilling was born in Queens, New York, the son of Fannie (née Cohen), who was from London, and David Trilling, a tailor from Bialystok in Poland. His family was Jewish. In 1921, he graduated from DeWitt Clinton High School, and, at age 16, entered Columbia University, thus beginning a lifelong association with the university. He joined the Boar's Head Society and wrote for the Morningside literary journal. In 1925, he graduated from Columbia College, and, in 1926, earned a master's degree at the university (his master's essay was entitled Theodore Edward Hook: his life and work). He then taught at the University of Wisconsin–Madison and at Hunter College.

In 1929 he married Diana Rubin, and the two began a lifelong literary partnership. In 1932 he returned to Columbia to pursue his doctoral degree in English literature and to teach literature. He earned his doctorate in 1938 with a dissertation about Matthew Arnold that he later published. He was promoted to assistant professor the following year, becoming Columbia's first tenured Jewish professor in its English department. He was promoted to full professor in 1948.

Trilling became the George Edward Woodberry Professor of Literature and Criticism in 1965. He was a popular instructor and for thirty years taught Columbia's Colloquium on Important Books, a course about the relationship between literature and cultural history, with Jacques Barzun. His students included Lucien Carr, Jack Kerouac, Donald M. Friedman, Allen Ginsberg, Eugene Goodheart, Steven Marcus, John Hollander, Richard Howard, Cynthia Ozick, Carolyn Gold Heilbrun, George Stade, David Lehman, Leon Wieseltier, Louis Menand, Robert Leonard Moore  and Norman Podhoretz.

Trilling was the Charles Eliot Norton Professor of Poetry at Harvard University for academic year 1969–70. In 1972, he was selected by the National Endowment for the Humanities to deliver the first Jefferson Lecture in the Humanities, described as "the highest honor the federal government confers for distinguished intellectual achievement in the humanities." Trilling was a senior Fellow of the Kenyon School of English and subsequently a senior Fellow of the Indiana School of Letters.

Partisan Review and the "New York Intellectuals"
In 1937, Trilling joined the recently revived magazine Partisan Review, a Marxist, but anti-Stalinist, journal founded by William Philips and Philip Rahv in 1934.

The Partisan Review was associated with the New York Intellectuals – Trilling, his wife Diana Trilling, Lionel Abel, Hannah Arendt, William Barrett, Daniel Bell, Saul Bellow, Richard Thomas Chase, F. W. Dupee, Leslie Fiedler, Paul Goodman, Clement Greenberg, Elizabeth Hardwick, Irving Howe, Alfred Kazin, Hilton Kramer, Steven Marcus, Mary McCarthy, Dwight Macdonald, William Phillips, Norman Podhoretz, Harold Rosenberg, Isaac Rosenfeld, Delmore Schwartz, and Susan Sontag – who emphasized the influence of history and culture upon authors and literature. The New York Intellectuals distanced themselves from the New Critics.

In his preface to the essays collection, Beyond Culture (1965), Trilling defended the New York Intellectuals: "As a group, it is busy and vivacious about ideas, and, even more, about attitudes. Its assiduity constitutes an authority. The structure of our society is such that a class of this kind is bound by organic filaments to groups less culturally fluent that are susceptible to its influence."

Critical and literary works
Trilling wrote one novel, The Middle of the Journey (1947), about an affluent Communist couple's encounter with a Communist defector. (Trilling later acknowledged that the character was inspired by his Columbia College compatriot and contemporary Whittaker Chambers.) His short stories include "The Other Margaret". Otherwise, he wrote essays and reviews in which he reflected on literature's ability to challenge the morality and conventions of the culture. Critic David Daiches said of Trilling, "Mr. Trilling likes to move out and consider the implications, the relevance for culture, for civilization, for the thinking man today, of each particular literary phenomenon which he contemplates, and this expansion of the context gives him both his moments of his greatest perceptions, and his moments of disconcerting generalization."

Trilling published two complex studies of authors Matthew Arnold (1939) and E. M. Forster (1943), both written in response to a concern with "the tradition of humanistic thought and the intellectual middle class which believes it continues this tradition." His first collection of essays, The Liberal Imagination, was published in 1950, followed by the collections The Opposing Self (1955), focusing on the conflict between self-definition and the influence of culture, Freud and the Crisis of Our Culture (1955), A Gathering of Fugitives (1956), and Beyond Culture (1965), a collection of essays concerning modern literary and cultural attitudes toward selfhood. In Sincerity and Authenticity (1972), he explores the ideas of the moral self in post-Enlightenment Western civilization. He wrote the introduction to The Selected Letters of John Keats (1951), in which he defended Keats's notion of negative capability, as well as the introduction, "George Orwell and the Politics of Truth," to the 1952 reissue of George Orwell's Homage to Catalonia.

In 2008, Columbia University Press published an unfinished novel that Trilling had abandoned in the late 1940s. Scholar Geraldine Murphy discovered the half-finished novel among Trilling's papers archived at Columbia University. Trilling's novel, The Journey Abandoned: The Unfinished Novel, is set in the 1930s and involves a young protagonist, Vincent Hammell, who seeks to write a biography of an older poet, Jorris Buxton. Buxton's character is loosely based on the nineteenth century Romantic poet Walter Savage Landor. Writer and critic Cynthia Ozick praised the novel's "skillful narrative" and "complex characters", writing, "The Journey Abandoned is a crowded gallery of carefully delineated portraits whose innerness is divulged partly through dialogue but far more extensively in passages of cannily analyzed insight."

Politics
Trilling's politics have been strongly debated and, like much else in his thought, may be described as "complex." An often-quoted summary of Trilling's politics is that he wished to:

Of ideologies, Trilling wrote, "Ideology is not the product of thought; it is the habit or the ritual of showing respect for certain formulas to which, for various reasons having to do with emotional safety, we have very strong ties and of whose meaning and consequences in actuality we have no clear understanding."

Politically, Trilling was a noted member of the anti-Stalinist left, a position that he maintained to the end of his life.

Liberal
In his earlier years, Trilling wrote for and in the liberal tradition, explicitly rejecting conservatism; from the preface to his 1950 essay The Liberal Imagination (emphasis added to the much-quoted last line):

Neoconservative
Some, both conservative and liberal, argue that Trilling's views became steadily more conservative over time.  Trilling has been embraced as sympathetic to neoconservativism by neoconservatives (such as Norman Podhoretz, the former editor of Commentary).  However, this embrace was unrequited; Trilling criticized the New Left (as he had the Old Left) but did not embrace neoconservativism.

His wife, Diana Trilling, claimed that neoconservatives were mistaken in thinking that Trilling shared their views. “I am of the firmest belief that he would never have become a neoconservative,” she announced in her memoir of their marriage, “The Beginning of the Journey,” adding that “nothing in his thought supports the sectarianism of the neoconservative."

The extent to which Trilling may be identified with neoconservativism continues to be contentious, forming a point of debate.

Moderate
Trilling has alternatively been characterized as solidly moderate, as evidenced by many statements, ranging from the very title of his novel, The Middle of the Journey, to a central passage from the novel:

Along the same lines, in reply to a taunt by Richard Sennett, "You have no position; you are always in between," Trilling replied, "Between is the only honest place to be."

Works by Trilling
Fiction
 
  (Selected by Diana Trilling and published posthumously.)
  (Published posthumously)

Non-fiction and essays
  (Based on Trilling's Ph.D. thesis.)
 
 
 
 
 
 
  (A collection of the Charles Eliot Norton Lectures given at Harvard in 1969.)
 
  (Published posthumously)
  (Published posthumously.)
  (Published posthumously.)
 
Adam Kirsch, ed. (2018). Life in Culture: Selected Letters of Lionel Trilling. New York: Farrar, Straus, and Giroux. . (Published posthumously.)

Prefaces, afterwords, and commentaries
 Introduction to 
 Introduction to 
 Introduction to 
 Introduction to 
 Introduction to 
 Preface and commentaries to 
 Introduction to 
 Introduction to James, Henry, The Princess Casamassima. New York, The Macmillan Company. 1948

Bibliography
Shoben, Edward Joseph Jr. Lionel Trilling Mind and Character, Frederick Ungar Publishing Co., 1981, 
Bloom, Alexander. Prodigal Sons: The New York Intellectuals & Their World, Oxford University Press, 1986. 
Chace, William M. “Lionel Trilling”, Johns Hopkins Guide to Literary Theory and Criticism.
Kirsch, Adam. Why Trilling Matters. Yale University Press, 2011. .
Krupnick, Mark. Lionel Trilling and the Fate of Cultural Criticism. Northwestern University Press, Evanston, 1986. 
Lask, Thomas. “Lionel Trilling, 70, Critic, Teacher and Writer, Dies”, The New York Times, November 5, 1975
Leitch, Thomas M. Lionel Trilling: An Annotated Bibliography. New York: Garland, 1992
Lionel Trilling, et al., The Situation in American Writing: A Symposium Partisan Review, Volume 6 5 (1939)
Longstaff, S. A. “New York Intellectuals”, Johns Hopkins Guide to Literary Theory and Criticism.
O'Hara, Daniel T. Lionel Trilling: The Work of Liberation. U. of Wisconsin P, 1988. 
Trilling, Diana. The Beginning of the Journey: The Marriage of Diana and Lionel Trilling. Harcourt, Brace & Company, 1993. .
Trilling, Lionel. Beyond Culture: Essays on Literature and Learning.

Alexander, Edward. Lionel Trilling and Irving Howe: And Other Stories of Literary Friendship. Transaction, 2009. .
Kimmage, Michael. The Conservative Turn: Lionel Trilling, Whittaker Chambers, and the Lessons of Anti-Communism. Harvard University Press, 2009. .
Ariano, Raffaele. Filosofia dell'individuo e romanzo moderno. Lionel Trilling tra critica letteraria e storia delle idee, Edizioni Storia e letteratura, 2019.

References

Further reading

External links

Columbia University – Profile of Trilling
Columbia University – Lionel Trilling Papers (1899–1987)
Article on The Middle of the Journey
Lionel Trilling at Columbia by Quentin Anderson

1905 births
1975 deaths
People from Queens, New York
American literary critics
American academics of English literature
American people of Polish-Jewish descent
Burials at Ferncliff Cemetery
University of Wisconsin–Madison faculty
Harvard University faculty
Hunter College faculty
Columbia College (New York) alumni
Columbia University faculty
Jewish American academics
Analysands of Rudolph Lowenstein
20th-century American novelists
American male novelists
DeWitt Clinton High School alumni
Novelists from Massachusetts
Novelists from New York (state)
Novelists from Wisconsin
20th-century American non-fiction writers
American male non-fiction writers
Columbia Graduate School of Arts and Sciences alumni
20th-century American male writers
20th-century American Jews
Members of the American Academy of Arts and Letters